Kunnathurmedu is a commercial, residential and institutional area in Palakkad city, Kerala, India. It mainly consists of residential colonies and apartments. Kunnathurmedu is wards 23 and 24 of Palakkad Municipality. Several offices related to the Police service of the city including Palakkad South and Traffic Police stations are situated here.

References

Palakkad
Suburbs of Palakkad
Cities and towns in Palakkad district